Ithome is a genus of moths in the family Cosmopterigidae.

Species
Ithome anthraceuta (Meyrick, 1915)
Ithome aquila Hodges, 1978
Ithome cathidrota (Meyrick, 1915)
Ithome chersota (Meyrick, 1915)
Ithome concolorella (Chambers, 1875) (syn: Ithome unimaculella Chambers, 1875, Ithome unomaculella)
Ithome curvipunctella (Walsingham, 1892) (syn: Eriphia quinquepunctata Forbes, 1931
Ithome edax Hodges, 1962
Ithome ferax Hodges, 1962
Ithome fuscula Forbes, 1931
Ithome iresiarcha (Meyrick, 1915)
Ithome lassula Hodges, 1962
Ithome pelasta (Meyrick, 1915)
Ithome pernigrella (Forbes, 1931)
Ithome pignerata (Meyrick, 1922)
Ithome simulatrix Hodges, 1978
Ithome tiaynai H.A. Vargas, 2004
Ithome volcanica Landry, 2001

Former species
Ithome erransella is now Perimede erransella Chambers, 1874

References
Natural History Museum Lepidoptera genus database
 , 1961: The genus Ithome in North America (Walshiidae). Journal of the Lepidopterists' Society 15 (2): 81–90. Full article: .
 , 2004: Una nueva especie de Ithome Chambers (Lepidoptera: Cosmopterigidae: Chrysopeleiinae) del norte de Chile. Rev. Chil. Hist. Nat. 77: 285–292. Abstract and full article: .

Chrysopeleiinae